Three Baronetcies have been created for persons with the surname Johnson: one of New York in 1755 in the Baronetage of Great Britain, and then one of Bath (1818) and one of Dublin (1909), both in the Baronetage of the United Kingdom. As of 2010 the Johnson baronetcy of Bath is dormant, and that of Dublin is extinct.

Johnson baronetcy of New York (1755)

The Johnson Baronetcy, of New York in North America, was created in the Baronetage of Great Britain on 27 November 1755 for the soldier William Johnson. A descendant of the O'Neill dynasty, his family name was originally MacShane (Irish: Mac Seáin), of which Johnson is a translation. The baronetcy was awarded for his victories at Crown Point and the Battle of Lake George earlier that year.

Johnson baronets of New York

Sir William Johnson, 1st Baronet (1715–1774). His nephew, Guy Johnson, was a distinguished soldier.
Sir John Johnson, 2nd Baronet (1742–1830) was a loyalist leader during the American Revolution. His son, Colonel Charles Christopher Johnson, had a son, John Ormsby Johnson, who was a vice-admiral.
Sir Adam Gordon Johnson, 3rd Baronet (1781–1843)
Sir William George Johnson, 4th Baronet (1830–1908)
Sir Edward Gordon Johnson, 5th Baronet (1867–1957)
Sir John Paley Johnson, 6th Baronet (1907–1975)
Sir Peter Colpoys Paley Johnson, 7th Baronet (1930–2003). 
Sir (Colpoys) Guy Johnson, 8th Baronet (born 1965)

The heir apparent is Colpoys William Johnson (born 1993).

All Johnson Baronets of New York from Sir Adam onward are, through his mother Ann Watts, descendants of the Schuyler family, the Delancey family, and the Van Cortlandt family of British North America.

Johnson baronetcy of Bath (1818)

The Johnson Baronetcy, of Bath, was created in the Baronetage of the United Kingdom on 1 December 1818 for Henry Johnson, a colonel in the 5th Regiment and Governor of Ross Castle. He was the younger brother of Sir John Johnson-Walsh, 1st Baronet, of Ballykilcavan (see Johnson-Walsh Baronets).

The presumed seventh Baronet never successfully established his claim to the title and was never on the Official Roll of the Baronetage. Likewise, as of 13 June 2007 the presumed eighth Baronet has not successfully proven his succession and is not on the Official Roll of the Baronetage, with the baronetcy dormant since 1986. For more information, follow this link.

Johnson baronets of Bath

Sir Henry Johnson, 1st Baronet (1748–1835)
Sir Henry Allen Johnson, 2nd Baronet (1785–1860). Fought with distinction in the Peninsular War. His sixth son, Sir Charles Cooper Johnson, was a general in the British Army. Charles Cooper's son, Eliot Philipse Johnson, was a brigadier-general in the British Army, and the father of the presumed seventh Baronet.
Sir Henry Franks Frederic Johnson, 3rd Baronet (1819–1883)
Sir Henry Allen William Johnson, 4th Baronet (1855–1944). Brigadier-general in the King's Own Yorkshire Light Infantry. 
Sir Henry Allen Beaumont Johnson, 5th Baronet (1887–1965)
Sir Victor Philipse Hill Johnson, 6th Baronet (1905–1986)
Robin Eliot Johnson, presumed 7th Baronet (1929–1989)
Patrick Eliot Johnson, presumed 8th Baronet (born 1955)

The presumed heir apparent to the baronetcy is Richard Eliot Johnson (born 1983), eldest son of the presumed 8th Baronet.

Johnson baronetcy of Dublin (1909)

The Johnson Baronetcy, of Dublin, was created in the Baronetage of the United Kingdom on 24 November 1909 for the Irish lawyer and politician William Moore Johnson. The title became extinct on his death in 1919.

See also
Johnson-Ferguson baronets
Johnson-Walsh baronets

Notes

References
Kidd, Charles, Williamson, David (editors). Debrett's Peerage and Baronetage (1990 edition). New York: St Martin's Press, 1990, 

Baronetcies in the Baronetage of Great Britain
Baronetcies in the Baronetage of the United Kingdom
Extinct baronetcies in the Baronetage of the United Kingdom
1755 establishments in Great Britain
1818 establishments in the United Kingdom